Tava'enga (previously Te-kura) is one of the six traditional districts of the island of Mangaia in the Cook Islands. It is located in the north of the island, to the west of the District of Karanga and east of the District of Kei'a. The district was traditionally divided into 6 tapere:
 Te-pueu
 Te-mati-o-Pa'eru
 Au-ruia
 Maro
 Te-rupe
 Ta'iti

References

Districts of the Cook Islands
Mangaia